Strange Bird is the second studio album by the Australian indie rock band Augie March. It was first released on 14 October 2002 in Australia by BMG and was re-released in the United States on 14 September 2004 by spinART.

Strange Bird followed from the success of the band's moderately successful first album, Sunset Studies, which was voted as one of the best albums of 2000 by listeners of national Australian radio network Triple J.  Strange Bird was quite a departure for the band, replacing the often mellow melodies of the first album with a more expansive, direct sound.

Background
Augie March formed in 1996, when four TAFE and university students formed a band led by English student Glenn Richards. They released two EPs; Thanks for the Memes and Waltz. Waltz received some industry recognition through nominations at the 2000 ARIA Music Awards, but neither EP was a mainstream success. Nonetheless Augie March were offered a contract with BMG. In 2000, Rob Dawson joined the band as a pianist, and the band recorded their debut album, Sunset Studies. The album was lauded by critics and ARIA but not by the general public. In January 2001, as the band were looking to work on a follow up, Dawson was killed in a  car crash. Keyboardist Kiernan Box was brought in to replace him.

Recording and production
Strange Bird was written in an abandoned telephone company building in Preston, a suburb of Melbourne. Unlike Sunset Studies, which was produced by Paul McKercher and Richard Pleasance, Augie March chose to produce Strange Bird independently; drummer Dave Williams explained to Beat that the band was so comfortable working together in the studio that they felt confident producing the album themselves. Recording sessions took place at Melbourne's Sing Sing Studios and Sydney's Megaphon and Big Jesusburger studios. Two tracks—"O Mi Sol Li Lon" and "Sunstroke House"—appeared on the album in their demo form.

Music and lyrics
Richards began writing songs for Strange Bird shortly after Dawson's death, and the event was heavy on his mind throughout the writing process. Richards argued the album was optimistic despite being often described as miserable, pointing to the humorous treatment of the subject of death in numerous songs on the album. Pitchfork Media's Joe Tangari suggested the listener place the lines "Onward and on to the ends of love/ Pricked vanity, habit and ruse/ Onward and on to a premature silence/ Where death finds too much use" from "This Train Will Be Taking No Passengers" in the context of Dawson's recent death to obtain a greater understanding of their meaning.

"The Vineyard", the first single from Strange Bird, was released on 16 September 2002. The song features Box' piano throughout and was described by BMG Australia as a "slice of delicious pop". The song received a common response to Augie March songs, with Impresss Jayson Argall writing that if he "was at pains to try and define the song or decipher its meaning, then maybe [his] attention would be better directed elsewhere". Guitarist Adam Donovan felt similarly, but with the consolation that "I've got a long time to live with it... I'm going to let it unravel as I listen to it more and more".

The titular "Strange Bird" is mentioned directly in both "the Keepa" and "This Train Will Be Taking No Passengers", and many other songs feature bird imagery in their lyrics.

Reception

The album was acclaimed upon release by critics. Triple J listeners voted "This Train Will Be Taking No Passengers" to number #66 in the 2002 Triple J Hottest 100 poll.

Track listing
All tracks written by Glenn Richards.

 "The Vineyard" – 5:01
 "This Train Will Be Taking No Passengers" – 4:30
 "Little Wonder" – 4:03
 "The Night Is a Blackbird" – 5:22
 "O Mi Sol Li Lon" – 1:21
 "Song in the Key of Chance" – 4:53
 "Up the Hill and Down" – 0:22
 "There's Something at the Bottom of the Black Pool" – 4:19
 "Addle Brains" – 5:29
 "The Keepa" – 5:40
 "The Drowning Dream" – 4:37
 "Sunstroke House" – 5:17
 "Brundisium" – 6:48
 "O Song" – 4:26

Charts

Personnel 
Augie March
 Adam Donovan
 David Williams
 Edmondo Ammendola
 Glenn Richards
 Kiernan Box

Additional musicians
 Matthew Habben – saxophone on tracks 8 and 14, clarinet on 13
 Ken Gardner – trumpet on 3, 8 and 14
 Adam Hutterer – trombone on 8
 Naomi Evans – violin on 6 and 13

References

2002 albums
Augie March albums